Centerville may refer to the following places in the U.S. state of West Virginia:
 Centerville, Tyler County, West Virginia, an unincorporated community
 Centerville, Wayne County, West Virginia, an unincorporated community